Spiridon "Špiro" Bocarić (24 May 1876 – 19 July 1941) was a Serb painter.

Bocarić was also one of the pioneers of cinematography of modern-day Bosnia and Herzegovina .

He was killed during the Genocide of Serbs by fascist Ustashe regime on 19 July 1941 at the Jadovno concentration camp near Gospić and his body was thrown in the Šaran pit.

Gallery

See also 
 List of painters from Serbia
 Serbian art

References

External links 

 Fenix Art article

1876 births
1941 deaths
People from Budva
Serbs of Montenegro
20th-century Serbian painters
20th-century Serbian male artists
People who died in Jadovno concentration camp
People executed by the Independent State of Croatia
Serb people who died in the Holocaust
Serbian civilians killed in World War II
Yugoslav people executed in Nazi concentration camps
Serbian male painters